Ponnala Lakshmaiah (born 15 February 1944) is an Indian politician, who served as the minister for Information Technology and Communications for the state of Andhra Pradesh, India. He was also a member of the legislative assembly of Andhra Pradesh, and a member of the All India Congress Committee. He was named president of the newly created Telangana Pradesh Congress Committee (TPCC) on 11 March 2014.  Ponnala Lakshmaiah  served four terms in the Assembly from the Jangaon Constituency in Warangal District.

Early life
Ponnala Lakshmaiah was born in the village of Quilashahpur, located in the heart of the Telangana region, into the Telugu-speaking Hindu family of Ponnala Radha (Radhamma) and Ponnala Rama Kishtaiah. He is married to Ponnala Arunadevi and has two children. He earned his M. S. Mechanical Engineering degree from Oklahoma State University in 1969.

Having come in contact with the World Bank and its programs for developing countries, he was attracted by rural development projects in India. He returned to India and worked to generate rural employment in the region of his birthplace. With his first project, he made improvements in areas such as poultry breeding, helping employ thousands of uneducated people. He also promoted the development of the dairy industry.

Political career
In 1980, Ponnala began working with the Congress Party. In the 1992 Congress Plenary session at Tirupati, he successfully handled the foreign delegates, including prime ministers of neighboring countries.

In 1986, he launched a protest under the name "Samagra Pochampad Karyacharana Samithi" and worked with District Leaders to modify the irrigation scheme to benefit the chronically drought-prone area. Prime Minister P. V. Narasimha Rao laid the foundation on 30 June 1993. The project was under execution in "Jalayagnam" at a cost of Rs. 30 billion.

Ponnala Foundation

Ponnala Lakshmaiah said that the Ponnala Foundation started by him would give away awards to mathematics genius every year in memory of the Indian math genius Srinivasa Ramanujan, in order to promote the subject among children.

Awards
Award for Outstanding Contribution by an Alumnus – Oklahoma State University (School of business) – Hall of Fame

References

Telangana politicians
People from Telangana
People from Hanamkonda district
Members of the Andhra Pradesh Legislative Assembly
Living people
1944 births
Oklahoma State University alumni